The 1994–95 Danish Superliga season was the 5th season of the Danish Superliga league championship, governed by the Danish Football Association.

The tournament was held in two rounds. The first round was in autumn 1994, and the second in spring 1995. The teams that placed first to eighth in first round, played in second round. Their goal scores were reset to zero, and their mutual points were shorted to the half.

The two teams placed ninth and tenth in first round, played in the qualification league in the spring. They had respectively 8 and 7 points with.

The Danish champions qualified for the UEFA Champions League 1995-96 qualification, while the second and third placed teams qualified for the qualification round of the UEFA Cup 1995-96. The fourth and sixth placed teams qualified for the UEFA Intertoto Cup 1995. The teams placed first to fourth in the qualification league promoted.

Autumn 1994

Table

Results

Spring 1995

Table

Results

Top goal scorers

See also
 1994-95 in Danish football

External links
  Peders Fodboldstatistik
  Haslund.info

Danish Superliga seasons
1994–95 in Danish football
Denmark